Madurai Lok Sabha constituency is one of the 39 Lok Sabha (parliamentary) constituencies in Tamil Nadu, a state in South India. Its Tamil Nadu Parliamentary Constituency number is 32.

Assembly segments
Madurai Lok Sabha constituency is composed of the following assembly segments:

Before 2009:

1.Thiruparankundram

2.Madurai West

3.Madurai Central

4.Madurai East

5.Samayanallur (SC)

6. Melur

Members of the Parliament

Election results

General Election 2019

General Election 2014

General Election 2009

General Election 2004

See also
 Madurai
 List of Constituencies of the Lok Sabha

References

Election Commission of India -http://www.eci.gov.in/StatisticalReports/ElectionStatistics.asp

External links
Madurai lok sabha  constituency election 2019 date and schedule

Madurai
Lok Sabha constituencies in Tamil Nadu
Madurai district
Politics of Madurai
Government of Madurai